Vatubua is a surname. Notable people with the surname include:

 Jale Vatubua (born 1991), Fijian rugby union player
 Jioji Vatubua, Fijian rugby league and union player
 Waisale Vatubua, Fijian rugby league and union player

Fijian-language surnames